Golubitskoye is a rural locality in Ryshkovsky Selsoviet Rural Settlement, Kursky District, Kursk Oblast, Russia. Population:

Geography 
The village is located on the Seym River (a left tributary of the Desna), 88 km from the Russia–Ukraine border, at the southern border of Kursk, 0.5 km from the selsoviet center – Ryshkovo.

 Streets
There are the following streets in the locality: Molodyozhnaya and Tsentralnaya (114 houses).

 Climate
Golubitskoye has a warm-summer humid continental climate (Dfb in the Köppen climate classification).

Transport 
Golubitskoye is located on the road of regional importance  (Kursk – Zorino – Tolmachyovo), in the vicinity of the railway halt 465 km (railway line Lgov I — Kursk).

The rural locality is situated 11 km from Kursk Vostochny Airport, 116 km from Belgorod International Airport and 210 km from Voronezh Peter the Great Airport.

References

Notes

Sources

Rural localities in Kursky District, Kursk Oblast